Lake Bunggee is a census-designated place (CDP) in the southwest part of the town of Woodstock in Windham County, Connecticut, United States, surrounding a lake of the same name. It is bordered to the west by the Witches Woods CDP.

Lake Bungee was first listed as a CDP prior to the 2020 census.

References 

Census-designated places in Windham County, Connecticut
Census-designated places in Connecticut